"Icy" is a song by South Korean girl group Itzy from their debut EP, titled It'z Icy. It was released by JYP Entertainment as the lead single on July 29, 2019.

On January 22, 2021, Itzy released their first English EP Not Shy (English Ver.), featuring the English version of "Icy", along with English versions of their other title tracks "Not Shy", "Wannabe" and "Dalla Dalla".

Itzy's first compilation album It'z Itzy, released on December 22, 2021, includes both Korean and Japanese-language versions of "Icy". The Japanese lyrics were written by D&H.

Composition
"Icy" was written by J. Y. Park and Penomeco. The song is written in the key D major and has a tempo of 125 beats per minute. It has been described as a "fiery and energetic summer song that promotes the quintet's passions about music." In a showcase, Itzy described the song as an extension of the group's first record, "Dalla Dalla," sharing similar meanings but having a more festive and upbeat air. The pre-chorus lyrics, consisting of lines such as "Icy but I'm on fire" and "Look at me, I'm not a liar," serves as the lead-up to the dynamic chorus of the song, and according to Billboard'''s Tamar Herman, "may as well be the girl group's anthem."

Critical receptionPop Crush'' included "Icy" in their best songs of 2019 list, writing that "it's a song that should sound overwhelming in theory, but instead is balanced perfectly with strong vocals, creating an effervescent dance track that empowers listeners to be confident and believe in themselves."

Music video

The music video for the title track was released at midnight of the same day and accumulated 18.1 million views within 24 hours. The music video was ranked at No. 7 on 2019 YouTube's Most Popular Music Video in South Korea, the group's second song to enter the list, with "Dalla Dalla" ranked in second place. As of August 2021, it has over 224 million views and 3,3 million likes on YouTube. The music video for "Icy" was filmed in Los Angeles.

Accolades

Commercial performance
"Icy" debuted at No. 11 of the Gaon Digital Chart, later peaking at No. 10 the second week, giving the group their second top ten song. "Icy" also debuted at No. 2 of the Gaon Download Chart. It also peaked at number 1 and 7 on the Billboard K-pop Hot 100 and World Digital Song Sales charts, respectively.

Credits and personnel
Credits adapted from NetEase Music.

 FRIDAY. (GALACTIKA *) — background vocals 
 e.NA — background vocals 
 CHANG (GALACTIKA *) — drums 
 ATHENA (GALACTIKA *) — keyboards 
 War of Stars * (GALACTIKA *) - background vocals recording 
 Jeong Yoo-ra — digital editing 
 HONZO — digital editing 
 Eom Se-hee — recording, assistant mixer 
 Kang Yeon-nu — recording
 Lee Tae-seop — mixer 
 Chris Gehringer — mastering

Charts

Weekly charts

Monthly charts

Year-end charts

Certifications

|-

Release history

See also
 List of Kpop Hot 100 number ones
 List of M Countdown Chart winners (2019)

References

Itzy songs
2019 singles
2019 songs
JYP Entertainment singles
Songs written by Park Jin-young
Billboard Korea K-Pop number-one singles